William Davidson (1811 – 12 May 1894) was an English cricketer with amateur status who was active from 1832 to 1837. He was born in England and died in Welwyn, Hertfordshire. He made his first-class debut in 1832 and appeared in four matches as an unknown handedness batsman whose bowling style is unknown, playing for Marylebone Cricket Club (MCC) and an England XI. He scored 22 runs with a highest score of 9* and took no wickets.

References

Bibliography
 

1811 births
1894 deaths
English cricketers
English cricketers of 1826 to 1863
Marylebone Cricket Club cricketers
Non-international England cricketers